Samuel Hieronymus Grimm (18 January 1733 – 14 April 1794)<ref name=gent>The Gentleman's Magazine, 1794, p399</ref> was an 18th-century Swiss landscape artist who worked in oils (until 1764), watercolours, and pen and ink media.

Grimm specialised in documenting historical scenes and events; he also illustrated books such as Gilbert White's The Natural History and Antiquities of Selborne.

Life and work

Early life and training in Bern and Paris
Grimm was born in 1733 in Burgdorf, a town situated to the north-east of Bern in Switzerland. Initially Grimm aspired to be a poet and in 1762 published a volume of poems. Shortly before 1760 Grimm moved to Bern and studied under Johann Ludwig Aberli who had taken over a drawing school that had previously been run by his uncle Johann Rudolf Grimm. Aberli specialised in topographical scenery, particularly of the Swiss Alps and he also patented a technique using faint outline etching for the mass production of these views. Grimm supplied drawings which were used to illustrate Friedrich von Hagedorn's Poetische Werke which was published between 1769 and 1772.

Grimm worked for Aberli until 1765, when at the age of 32, he moved to Paris to study under Johann Georg Wille who was a member of the Académie royal de peinture et de sculpture and Graveur de Roi. Under Wille, was able to greatly expand his skill as landscape and topographical artist. Surviving work shows that he made sketching trips in the Bois de Boulogne, Normandy and Picardy. At this time he perfected his skills as watercolour artist and a recorder of historic buildings. About March 1768, Grimm left Paris for London. Wille wrote about Grimm était un bien honnête garçon que nous estimions beaucoup.

Move to England
Critics of his time remarked that Grimm was a "man of genius". He was adopted as a travelling companion of the Rev. Sir Richard Kaye who became Rector of Kirkby in Ashfield in 1765 – his role was to record "anything curious". In 1775 Grimm was known to be in Derbyshire and Staffordshire, and by 1778 was working in London.

Grimm died in Tavistock Street in London on 14 April 1794, and left his money to a niece in Switzerland. He was buried at St Paul's church in Covent Garden in a service taken by Kaye, who had become the Dean of Lincoln.

Role as a recording historian

Grimm's speciality was visually documenting historical relics in the kind of detail that might otherwise have gone unreported. For example, the British Library credits him with documenting the only surviving scene of the coronation of Edward VI. Another example of a unique artistic recording is the 1790 ink-wash drawing he produced of the chapel at Calcot Manor in Gloucestershire, long since ruined, and a drawing of Samuel Pegge's church which was later rebuilt after a fire. He also made a number of drawings of the body of Little Saint Hugh of Lincoln when his coffin was opened.

The British Library possesses 2,662 drawings in twelve volumes by this artist, covering many of the counties of England and a further 886 watercolours, in seven volumes, dedicated to the county of Sussex.

Patronage

Grimm's leading patron was Sir Richard Kaye, but this was not his only income. He also undertook work for the naturalist Gilbert White, illustrating his The Natural History and Antiquities of Selborne, and Sir William Burrell. Burrell gave Grimm's Sussex collection in 1796, whilst Sir Richard bequeathed his collection of Grimm's art to the British Museum in 1810. Luckily they valued his work more than Grimm himself, who had left instructions for his papers to be destroyed after his death.

 References 

Exhibition
 Kunstmuseum Bern (17.01. – 21 April 2014) Samuel Hieronymus Grimm (1733–1794). A Very English Swiss, A Talented and much-admired Swiss in England.

 Further reading 

 Clay, Rotha Mary. Samuel Hieronymus Grimm of Burgdorf in Switzerland (Faber, 1941).
 Dolman, Brett. 'Everything Curious':Samuel Hieronymus Grimm and Sir Richard Kaye.
 Hauptmann W. (2014), Samuel Hieronymous Grimm: (1733–1794), A very English Swiss, Kunst Museum Bern. 
 Plaideux, Hugues. « Samuel Hieronymus Grimm (1733–1794) : ses oeuvres en Normandie et l'iconographie authentique de l'abbaye de Cherbourg », in Les Anglais en Normandie'', Actes du 45e Congrès des Sociétés historiques et archéologiques de Normandie (Saint-Sauveur-le-Vicomte, octobre 2010), vol. 16, 2011, p. 373–384.

External links 
 S H Grimm online (ArtCyclopedia)
 
 South-east view of St Lawrence Church, Whitwell, Derbyshire (Christie's)

18th-century Swiss painters
18th-century Swiss male artists
Swiss male painters
Landscape artists
Swiss watercolourists
Swiss emigrants to the United Kingdom
People from Burgdorf, Switzerland
1733 births
1794 deaths